Citizens is the first studio album by Christian rock band Citizens, which was released on March 12, 2013 by BEC Recordings and Mars Hill Music, and the producer on the album is Brian Eichelberger. This album has seen critical success.

Background 
Zach Bolen of Citizens gave an interview to Worship Leader and were asked "Citizens will be your first full-length album. What are your hopes for this record? What are you most excited to share with listeners?"

Songwriting 
Zach Bolen of Citizens was asked the question in the same interview with Worship Leader that "You have said you write to bring healing and peace to your community, how do you accomplish something like that with music?"

Critical reception

Citizens has received all favorably positive reviews from five critics. At CCM Magazine, Matt Conner told that "the new movement of worship music out of Mars Hill is one of the most imaginative and important shifts within the Christian music industry in years, and Citizens is the latest example alongside The Modern Post and Ghost Ship. Citizens echoes Passion Pit or Two Door Cinema Club comparisons with their club rock groove, and gospel-centric lyrics on each tune bolster their theological importance." Tyler Hess of Christian Music Zine found that Citizens are "appear[ing] to be putting forth an attempt to buck that trend" of what the standard worship album is to be. In addition, Hess alluded us to "ponder what a worship song would sound like with an indie rocker up in front", and add to that "a return to energy and excitement, not just when there are 50,000 people at a festival, but even contained in a studio production" because that is what the album contains. Hess was critical in noting that this "isn't like this is the best album ever created", which means "this album isn't perfect", yet the album "it is simply a step in the right direction, with a huge sound that gives the rest of us a little something to look forward to in the years to come."

Indie Vision Music's Jonathan Andre highlighted that "both musically and lyrically" that the project is "a treasure". Also, Andre called this album "a breath of fresh air in terms of worship and praise in an industry full of similar artist styles and tired and overused themes and messages throughout the many radio and church hits throughout the years." At Louder Than the Music, Jono Davies surmised that "to be fair to Citizen[s], this rock album lets some amazing lyrics pour out of the songs. What Citizen have done is shown that we can still worship God to amazing rock 'n roll songs that punch above their weight." At Jesus Freak Hideout, Ryan Barbee vowed that "Citizens is an album made for the Christian who has wanted to sing gospel-centered lyrics but not sacrifice artful music on the altar of conformity." Additionally, Barbee evoked that the band has "not only offered up some great tunes - they are paving a new road in music", which is truly "a game-changer."

Jonathan Francesco of New Release Tuesday surmised that "while the song titles for their self-titled debut might not indicate a very original project, the music is actually surprisingly fresh." Francesco noted that "there are numerous musical highpoints on the album that will help it to standout [sic] from the pack. Lyrically, though, it's pretty much the standard fare", but the album "more than accomplishes what it set out to accomplish." Lastly, Francesco found that "Citizens manage to find a workable balance between catchy pop music and uplifting praise and worship." Cross Rhythms' Josh Dipple found that the release "can't be faulted for its energy, with songs that long to be played to big crowds at summer festivals, played expertly by a band who have obviously been studiously taking notes, watching the likes of Kings Of Leon and The Strokes."

Readers of Reel Gospel voted Citizens the inaugural winner of Reel Gospel Readers' Album of the Year in 2013.

Commercial performance
On March 23, 2013, the album was the sixth most sold Billboard Top Heatseekers album.

Track listing

Charts
Album

References

2013 debut albums
Citizens & Saints albums
BEC Recordings albums